The competition of the men's 3 metre springboard was held on June 4, the third day of the 2010 FINA Diving World Cup.

Results

Green denotes finalists

2010 FINA Diving World Cup